The non-marine molluscs of Hawaii are part of the molluscan fauna of Hawaii, which in turn is part of the (wildlife of Hawaii).

A number of species of non-marine molluscs are found in the wild in Hawaii. In addition there are at least ? gastropod species living as hothouse aliens, only in greenhouses, aquaria, and terraria.

There are ??? species of gastropods ?? species of freshwater gastropods, ?? species of land gastropods and ?? species of bivalves living in the wild in the Hawaiian Islands.

There are ?? non-indigenous species of gastropods (?? freshwater and ?? land species) and ?? species of bivalves in the wild in Hawaii. This is altogether a total of ?? freshwater non-indigenous species of wild molluscs.

Summary table of number of species
(The summary table is based on species counted in this list, and also includes also those species with question marks)

Extinct gastropods in Hawaii include: ....

Shells of local land snails which were collected by David Dwight Baldwin can be seen in the Bailey House Museum in Wailuku, Maui.

Freshwater gastropods 

Neritidae
 Neritina granosa Sowerby – endemic

Lymnaeidae
 Erinna newcombi – endemic to Kauaʻi

Land gastropods 
Land gastropods in Hawaii include:

Achatinellidae
 Achatinella – all 40 species of Achatinella are endemic to O`ahu
 Perdicella fulgurans Sykes, 1900 – extinct

Endodontidae
 Cookeconcha contorta – endemic...

Pupillidae
 Pupoidopsis hawaiensis Pilsbry & Cooke, 1920

Pristilomatidae
 ...

Euconulidae
 ...

Oxychilidae
 Godwinia – the genus is endemic to Hawaii

Vitrinidae
 ...

Bivalvia

See also
 List of non-marine molluscs of the United States

References

2012 Holland B.S., T. Chock, A. Lee & S. Sugiura. Tracking behavior in the snail, Euglandina rosea: First evidence of preference for endemic versus biocontrol target pest species in Hawaii. American Malacological Bulletin 30(1):153–157.

2011 Sugiura, S., B.S Holland & R.H. Cowie. Predatory behaviour in juvenile Euglandina rosea.  Journal of Molluscan Studies 77: 101–102.

2010 Holland, B.S., S.L. Montgomery, & V. Costello. A reptilian smoking gun: first record of invasive Jackson's chameleon (Chamaeleo jacksonii xantholophus) predation on native Hawaiian species. Biodiversity and Conservation 19(5):1437–1441.

2009 Holland, B.S. Island flora and fauna: Snails. In: The Encyclopedia of Islands. (R. Gillespie & D.A. Clague, eds), pages 537–542, Science Publishing Group, University of California Press. Invited contribution.

2009 Holland, B.S. & R.H. Cowie. Land snail models in biogeography: A tale of two snails. American Malacological Bulletin 27:59–68. Invited review.

2008 Holland, B.S., C.C. Christensen, K.A. Hayes, R.H. Cowie. Biocontrol in Hawaii: A Response to Messing (2007). Proceedings of the Hawaiian Entomological Society. 40:81–83.

2007 Holland, B.S. & R.H. Cowie. A geographic mosaic of passive dispersal: population structure in the endemic Hawaiian amber snail Succinea caduca (Mighels 1845). Molecular Ecology, 16(12): 2422–2435.

2007 Holland, B.S. & M.G. Hadfield. Molecular systematics of the endangered O‘ahu tree snail Achatinella mustelina (Mighels 1845): Synonymization of subspecies and estimation of gene flow between chiral morphs. Pacific Science, 61(1): 53–66.

2006 Holland, B.S. & R.H. Cowie. New island records for the endemic Hawaiian land snail Succinea caduca (Mighels 1845). Bishop Museum Occasional Papers, 88: 58–60.

2004 Hadfield, M.G., B.S. Holland & K.J. Olival. Contributions of Ex Situ Propagation and Molecular Genetics to the Conservation of Hawaiian Tree Snails. In: Experimental Approaches to Conservation Biology. (M. Gordon & S. Bartol, eds). University of California Press, Berkeley and Los Angeles. Pages 16–34.

2004 Holland, B.S. & M.G. Hadfield. Origin and diversification of the endemic Hawaiian tree snails (Achatinellinae: Achatinellidae) based on molecular evidence. Molecular Phylogenetics and Evolution, 32(2): 588–600.

2004 Rundell, R.J., B.S. Holland, & R.H. Cowie. Molecular phylogeny and biogeography of endemic Hawaiian succineid land snails (Pulmonata: Gastropoda). Molecular Phylogenetics and Evolution, 31: 246–255.

2002 Holland, B.S. & M.G. Hadfield. Islands within an island: phylogeography and conservation genetics of the endangered Hawaiian tree snail Achatinella mustelina. Molecular Ecology, 11(3): 365–376.

Further reading 
 Joe S. M. & Daehler C. C. (2008) "Invasive slugs as under-appreciated obstacles to rare plant restoration: evidence from the Hawaiian Islands". Biological Invasions 10: 245–255. 
 Severns M. (2011). Shells of the Hawaiian Islands. The Land shells. 459 pp.; The Sea Shells 462 pp. Conchbooks.

External links 
 Hawaiian Freshwater & Terrestrial Mollusk Checklist
 Mollusks of Hawaii

Molluscs
Lists of fauna of Hawaii
Hawaii
Hawaii
.Hawaii
.Hawaii